Habry is a town in the Havlíčkův Brod District in the Vysočina Region of the Czech Republic. It has about 1,300 inhabitants.

Administrative parts
Villages of Frýdnava, Lubno and Zboží are administrative parts of Habry.

Notable people
František Ladislav Chleborád (1839–1911), economist

References

External links

Cities and towns in the Czech Republic
Populated places in Havlíčkův Brod District